Lady Alexandra Naldera Metcalfe, CBE (née Curzon; 20 March 1904 – 7 August 1995) was the third daughter of George Curzon, 1st Marquess Curzon of Kedleston and Viceroy of India, and Lord Curzon's first wife, the American mercantile heiress, Mary Victoria Curzon, Baroness Curzon of Kedleston (née Leiter). She was named after her godmother, Queen Alexandra and her place of conception, Naldehra, India. She and her two older sisters were the subjects of a biography by Anne de Courcy in The Viceroy's Daughters: The Lives of the Curzon Sisters.

Early life
Alexandra was conceived in July 1903 at Naldehra, 25 km from Shimla, perhaps after a game of high-altitude golf, and was named after that place. Her mother died in 1906 when Alexandra was only two years old. Her father's Indian servants called her "Baba Sahib", "Baby Master", and she was thereafter best known as "Baba".  She and her sisters, Mary Irene and Cynthia, "Cimmie", were brought up in grand houses, Hackwood Park and Montacute; their London home, 1 Carlton Gardens in Carlton House Terrace, became a centre of elite social life after Curzon's second marriage to Grace Elvina Duggan in 1917. She was dubbed the "prettiest debutante of the 1922 season".

Adulthood
She was the first love of Prince George, Duke of Kent. However, on 21 July 1925 she married Major Edward Dudley Metcalfe, the best friend and equerry of George's older brother, Edward VIII. She was one of a handful of witnesses to Edward's marriage to Wallis Simpson. 

The Metcalfes had a son, David (1927–2012), and twin daughters, Dinah (later known as Davina) and Sheilah (later known as Linda) born November 1930, registered at St Georges Hanover Square. 

Lady Alexandra had affairs with Jock Whitney, Michael Lubbock, Walter Monckton, and Charles Duncombe, 3rd Earl of Feversham. 
Before World War II she earned the sobriquet Baba Blackshirt, and for a while played a murky role as a semiwitting go-between for Oswald Mosley and her other lover at the time, Dino Grandi, Benito Mussolini's ambassador to London, while simultaneously enjoying the romantic devotion of the foreign secretary, Lord Halifax, who was staying at the same Dorchester Hotel as Alexandra and her sister.

Later life
The main thrust of Baba's later life was her tireless efforts for the Save the Children Fund, a commitment that lasted for more than 40 years. Lady Alexandra joined the Save the Children Fund in 1950 and was very active in fund-raising in London. In 1955, she and her husband divorced and she became a member of the fund's governing council. Later she would become chairman of the Overseas Relief and Welfare Committee, which controls all overseas work of the fund. In 1974 she was elected vice-president.

Honours
She was appointed Commander of the Order of the British Empire for those efforts in 1975.

Death
She died on 7 August 1995 at age 91 at John Radcliffe Hospital, Oxford.

In popular culture
Alexandra was portrayed in the 1980 seven-episode television mini-series, Edward and Mrs. Simpson, which won the 1980 Emmy Award for Outstanding Limited Series.

She was portrayed by Flora Montgomery in the four-episode Channel Four (UK) television drama mini-series Mosley in 1998. It was based on the books Rules of the Game and Beyond the Pale by Nicholas Mosley, Mosley's son.

She was portrayed by Rebecca Saire in season 2 of The Crown, in the episode "Vergangenheit".

References
Sarah Bradford, (9 August 1995) Lady Alexandra Metcalfe, The Independent, London. Retrieved 9 April 2007 Short Biography

1904 births
1995 deaths
Commanders of the Order of the British Empire
Alexandra
Daughters of British marquesses
English people of American descent
English people of Swiss descent